Cristian David Echavarría Vélez (born 10 July 1997) is a Colombian professional footballer who plays for Independiente Medellín.

Career

Club

In June 2017, Echavarría signed for SJK.

References

External links
 
 

1997 births
Living people
Colombian footballers
Colombian expatriate footballers
Independiente Medellín footballers
Wisła Kraków players
Venados F.C. players
Seinäjoen Jalkapallokerho players
FC Honka players
Patriotas Boyacá footballers
Jaguares de Córdoba footballers
Ascenso MX players
Ykkönen players
Categoría Primera A players
Association football midfielders
Colombian expatriate sportspeople in Mexico
Colombian expatriate sportspeople in Poland
Colombian expatriate sportspeople in Finland
Expatriate footballers in Mexico
Expatriate footballers in Poland
Expatriate footballers in Finland